Itkohwa is one of the villages under Block-Madanpur, Aurangabad district, Bihar, India. The village is bounded by Bijuliya and Basant. Gaya is its nearest largest city and the neighboring district headquarters.

History 

The common belief is that the village was a sati-asthal once, but during Raja Ram Mohan Roy-led reforms and initiatives of Lord William Bentinck it was completely abolished.

Statistics 

 Headquarters: Chowk 
 Area: Total 5,000 m2
 Population: Total: 200–250 
 Agriculture: wheat, potato, rice, seasonal vegetables
 Temperature: minimum 4 °C, maximum 42 °C
 Location of Itkohwa In Bihar
 Administrative division  Magadh
 Headquarters 	Aurangabad, India
 Literacy rate	80%
 Lok Sabha Constituencies Aurangabad
 Vidhan Sabha Constituency: Rafiganj
 Major highways 	NH 2
 24°44'6.58"N, 84°37'40.54"

References

Villages in Aurangabad district, Bihar